Corridor Digital is an American production studio based in Los Angeles, known for creating pop-culture-related viral online short-form videos since 2010, as well as producing and directing the Battlefield-inspired web series Rush and the YouTube Premium series Lifeline. It has also created television commercials for various companies, including Machine Zone and Google.

Corridor Digital has nine full-time employees (January 2019), including founders Sam Gorski and Niko Pueringer. As of March 2023, the channel has 9.79 million subscribers and has won awards at several Streamys, including the "Visual and Special Effects Award" in 2017. Its second channel, Corridor Crew, consists of behind-the-scenes content, including the popular series VFX Artists React and VFX Artist Reveals, the latter of which is hosted by Wren Weichman. The channel, @Corridor, has 9.79 million subscribers as of March 9, 2023. 
On August 11, 2022, the channel was hacked by a crypto scam, and terminated by YouTube. However, the channel and its content were later restored.

History and prominent projects
Pueringer and Gorski began working together in junior high in Stillwater, Minnesota, making student films with an emphasis on special effects. In 2008 they moved to Los Angeles, where they focused on special effects for other projects. In 2010, they released a Modern Warfare fan film, "Modern Warfare: Frozen Crossing", filmed in Minnesota, like many of their early projects. In subsequent years, Pueringer and Gorski began creating more short-form content. In 2012, they created the viral hits "The Glitch" and "Minecraft: The Last Minecart". They were featured in the 2012, 2013 and 2014 YouTube Rewind.

In 2016, they co-wrote, co-directed, and produced the Battlefield-inspired web series Rush.

Lifeline

In 2017, Corridor produced and directed the YouTube Red series Lifeline, which was executive produced by Dwayne Johnson and a collaboration with his Seven Bucks Productions. The show was an American science fiction drama web television series broadcast on the YouTube Red network which began October 11, 2017.

Top 10 Games You Can Play In Your Head, By Yourself

In 2019, the company published a book, Top 10 Games You Can Play In Your Head, By Yourself, released on Amazon and publicized with a commercial on its YouTube channel. The book is a collaboration between Gorski and author D. F. Lovett.

Boston Dynamics parody videos

In June 2019, Corridor released a video in which a robot in the style of Boston Dynamics is abused in a variety of ways before finally fighting back against the humans attacking it. The video, watermarked "Bosstown Dynamics" instead of "Boston Dynamics", went viral across platforms, although most versions dropped attribution to the original source, with many claiming it to be an authentic Boston Dynamics video.

After the online confusion, Corridor clarified that the video was never meant to be interpreted as "real", and that it would "like for people to be able to see the original". Gizmodo wrote that the "real lesson from Corridor’s fake robot video might be just how far [robot technology has] come in real life over the past decade".

On October 26, 2019, Corridor published a second video in which the same robot can be seen acting as a soldier, shooting targets before escaping his human owners with a Boston Dynamics Spot. This video was received very similarly to the first, going viral on multiple platforms, with many people believing it was real.

Their videos were received to be so realistic that in 2021, when Boston Dynamics published a video titled "Do you love me" featuring its robots dancing, it received comments alleging that those were CGI videos made by Corridor Digital and Corridor Crew had to publish a video proving how the Boston Dynamics video is not a VFX shot and is real.

Rush
Rush, a Battlefield-inspired web series, was originally released for Go90 in 2016 and rereleased on Corridor's YouTube channel in 2019.

Hacking
On August 11, 2022, the company's Corridor Crew YouTube channel was hacked. The hackers gained control of the channel and began a live stream featuring a cryptocurrency scam. The company appeared to have regained control, when the account was terminated by YouTube. Their account was recovered two days later on August 13.

Corridor Crew

VFX Artists React 
VFX Artists React is a series on the Corridor Crew channel in which three Corridor members discuss and break down visual effects shots from various films and TV series. Their most popular subseries is VFX Artists React to Bad & Great CGi. There have been numerous other subseries, such as "Stuntmen React" and "Animators React." Multiple guests have appeared on VFX Artists React, such as Seth Rogen, Adam Savage, visual directors of various visual effects studios, and numerous other creators.

VFX Artist Reveals 
Visual Effects Artist Reveals is a series on Corridor Crew where the host Wren Weichman, a VFX artist and a mechanical engineer, talks about science and technology and reveals the real life scale of famous objects. The series has videos exploring the size of atoms, the real life scale and power of cannons on warships, the speed of sound, the solar system, SpaceX rockets, Star Wars spaceships, and Titans from Attack on Titan,. They also address issues like the amount of water on Earth, climate change, and the exponential growth of COVID-19.

Collaborations
Corridor Digital frequently collaborates with various other prominent YouTubers, including Mike Diva, Freddie Wong (AKA RocketJump), Jimmy Wong, Adrian Picardi, Brandon Laatsch and Markiplier. They have also worked with Black Rifle Coffee Company.

References

Video production companies
Mass media companies of the United States
Companies based in Los Angeles
American companies established in 2010
2010 establishments in California
Mass media companies established in 2010